John Pettersson may refer to:
 John Pettersson (boxer)
 John Pettersson (football manager)

See also
 John Petersson, Danish swimmer and president of the European Paralympic Committee